Flower Crew: Joseon Marriage Agency is a 2019 South Korean television series starring Kim Min-jae, Gong Seung-yeon, Seo Ji-hoon, Park Ji-hoon, Byeon Woo-seok, and Ko Won-hee. It is based on the 2014 novel of the same name by Kim Yi-rang who also wrote the series. It aired on JTBC's Mondays and Tuesdays at 21:30 (KST) time slot from September 16 to November 5, 2019.

Synopsis
Ma Hoon, Young-soo, and Do Joon are Joseon's most successful marriage agency called Flower Crew and also known for their handsome features. Lee Soo, a blacksmith's son, wanted to marry his friend Gae-ttong, a wild and carefree girl, and requested Flower Crew to help him arrange the marriage. However, Ma Hoon, the leader of Flower Crew, rejected him continuously until he finally sees Lee Soo's genuine heart for Gae-ttong and agreed to arrange their marriage. On the marriage day, Lee Soo was captured and selected as the King of Joseon all of a sudden. How will the Flower Crew handle this crisis and what will happen to Gae-ttong and Lee Soo's marriage?

Cast

Main
 Kim Min-jae as Ma Hoon
 Choi Seung-hoon as young Ma Hoon
The silent and cold founder of Flower Crew. Known as the most intelligent and handsome man in Hanyang, he is also the leader and the best matchmaker of the crew.
 Gong Seung-yeon as Gae-ttong /  Yoon Soo-yun
Lee Go-eun as young Gae-ttong
Lee Soo's first love. She has a stubborn personality and does many jobs to survive and to find her long-lost brother. She eventually joins Flower Crew to repay her marriage debt.
 Seo Ji-hoon as Lee Soo
 Cha Sung-je as young Lee Soo
A 23-year-old humble blacksmith who is in love with Gae-ttong. He gets captured on his wedding day and learns that he is to be the new king of Joseon.
 Park Ji-hoon as Go Young-soo / Chil-nom
A fashionable young man who is an asset to the Flower Crew as he can turn any client into a beauty. Although he sometimes can be childish, he is known to be a very nice person.
 Byeon Woo-seok as Do Joon
 Lee Seung-woo as young Do Joon
The Flower Crew's informant. Due to his handsome looks, many girls in Hanyang adore him and he uses this advantage to collect information in and around Hanyang. He eventually falls for Kang Ji-hwa.
 Go Won-hee as Kang Ji-hwa
The vain daughter of Second Chief State Councillor who is very cold and overbearing, especially towards commoners and slaves.

Supporting

People around Ma Hoon
 Park Ho-san as Ma Bong-deok 
 Ma Hoon's father, also, the Chief State Councillor 
 Jung Yoon-seok as Ma Joon

People around Gae-ttong
 Jang Yoo-sang as Kang
 Park Sang-hoon as young Kang
Gae-ttong's long-lost brother

People around Lee Soo
 Lee Yoon-gun as Lee Moon-seok
 Ha Hoe-jung as Eunuch Jang
 Ahn Da-bi as Se-ah

People around Do Joon
 Kim Hye-ji as Seom Seom
 A girl from a courtesan house that frequently helps Do Joon to collect informations
 Jung Ji-yoon as Do-joon's mother

People around Kang Ji-hwa
 Jung Jae-sung as Kang Mong-gu
Kang Ji-hwa's father, also, the Second Chief State Councillor
 Park Bo-mi as Chun-sim
One of Ji-hwa's slave who always appears with her. She also had a crush on Kang, another slave of Ji-hwa's and Gae-ttong's brother.

Others
 Kwon So-hyun as Queen Dowager Yoon
 Jang Eui-je as Hyun
 Lee Chae-won as Ma Jeong-hwa
 Choi Yi-seon as Tae-soo
 Flower Crew servant

Special appearances
 Jo Sung-ha as King (Ep. 1–2)
 Go Soo as Crown Prince (Ep. 1)
 Woo Hyun as doctor (Ep. 1)
 Ahn Se-ha as peddler (Ep. 1)
 Jang Su-won as Jang In-sung (Ep. 1)
 Park Soo-ah as Lee Eun-young (Ep. 1)
 Lee Su-ji as young lady (Ep. 1)
 Jo Ryun as inn owner (Ep. 2)
 Choi Jin-hyuk as the Second Chief State Councillor's niece's matched guy (Ep. 5)
 Daniel Lindemann as a German customer (Ep. 16)

Production
The first script reading took place in April 2019 at JTBC Building in Sangam-dong, Seoul, South Korea. Filming was wrapped up on October 10, 2019.

Original soundtrack

Part 1

Part 2

Part 3

Viewership

Notes

References

External links
  
 
 

Korean-language television shows
JTBC television dramas
2019 South Korean television series debuts
2019 South Korean television series endings
South Korean historical television series
South Korean romantic comedy television series
Television series set in the Joseon dynasty
Television shows based on South Korean novels
Television series by Blossom Entertainment